The Central African Republic Air Force is the aerial warfare branch of the Central African Republic Armed Forces. As of 2017 it has been a branch of the Ground Force.

The Air Force is reported to be almost inactive due to the unserviceability of its aircraft. Dassault Mirage F1s of the French Air Force regularly patrol troubled regions of the country and also participate in direct confrontations. According to some sources, former President François Bozizé used the money he got from the mining concession in Bakouma to buy two old Mil Mi-8 helicopters from Ukraine and one Lockheed C-130 Hercules, built in the 1950s, from the U.S. The air force otherwise operates several light aircraft, including a single helicopter.

Aircraft

Current inventory

References

Notes

Bibliography 
 Hoyle, Craig. "World Air Forces Directory". Flight International, Vol. 180 No. 5321, 13–19 December 2011. pp. 26–52.
''World Aircraft Information Files. Brightstar Publishing, London. File 338 Sheet 02

External links
 Photo of AS-350B Ecureuil TL-KAZ 

Military of the Central African Republic
Air forces by country
Military aviation in Africa